Berberis alpicola is a shrub endemic to Taiwan. It grows high in the mountains at elevations of approximately 3600 m.

Berberis alpicola is an evergreen shrub up to 130 cm tall, with spines along the twigs. Leaves are elliptical, up to 25 mm long, shiny on both surfaces but a bit lighter shade of green below. Flowers are solitary. Berries are ellipsoid, nearly black, up to 10 mm long.

References

alpicola
Endemic flora of Taiwan
Plants described in 1939